The Glendive Heat, Light and Power Company Power Plant on Clough St. in Glendive, Montana was built in 1914.  It was listed on the National Register of Historic Places in 1988.  The listing included a contributing building and two contributing structures.

The power generating plant was built in 1914 by the Glendive Heat, Light and Power Co. and included two General Electric 500 KW turbo-generators and
three coal-fired sterling boilers.  These burned lignite coal.  The Eastern Montana Light and Power Company took over the plant in 1920.  It was bought in 1926 by the Minnesota Northern Power Company, which installed a 2,000-KW Allis Chalmers generator with a Webster gas burner.

It was listed on the National Register as part of a study of multiple historic resources in Glendive which also listed several others. It is now the Farm to Table store in Glendive, Montana.

References

Energy infrastructure completed in 1914
National Register of Historic Places in Dawson County, Montana
Industrial buildings and structures on the National Register of Historic Places in Montana
Energy infrastructure on the National Register of Historic Places
1914 establishments in Montana
Former coal-fired power stations in the United States